M8 or M-8 or M.08 or variant, may refer to:

Computing and electronics
 M8 (cipher), an encryption algorithm
 Leica M8, a digital rangefinder camera
 HTC One (M8), a smartphone
 Meizu M8, a smartphone

Places
 Messier 8, also known as M8 or Lagoon Nebula, a giant interstellar cloud
 William L. Whitehurst Field (FAA airport code M08), Bolivar, Hardeman County, Tennessee, USA

Rail stations
 Meijō Kōen Station (station code M08), Kita, Nagoya, Aichi, Japan
 Senri-Chūō Station (station code M08), Toyonaka, Osaka, Japan
 Tatsue Station (station code M08), Komatsushima, Tokushima, Japan

Roads
 M-8 (Michigan highway), also known as the Davison Freeway
 M8 (East London), a Metropolitan Route in East London, South Africa
 M8 (Cape Town), a Metropolitan Route in Cape Town, South Africa
 M8 (Johannesburg), a Metropolitan Route in Johannesburg, South Africa
 M8 (Pretoria), a Metropolitan Route in Pretoria, South Africa
 M8 (Durban), a Metropolitan Route in Durban, South Africa
 M8 (Port Elizabeth), a Metropolitan Route in Port Elizabeth, South Africa
 M8 highway (Russia), also known as the Kholmogory Highway
 M8 motorway (Hungary)
 M8 motorway (Ireland)
 M-8 highway (Montenegro)
 M8 motorway (Pakistan)
 M8 motorway (Scotland)
 M8 Motorway (Sydney) in Sydney, Australia
 Highway M08 (Ukraine)
 Western Freeway (Victoria) in Australia, designated M8
 M8 Road (Zambia)

Civilian transportation

Road transport
 M8 (New York City bus), a New York City Bus route in Manhattan
 BMW M8, a sporty car from BMW 8 Series
 Mercedes-Benz M08 engine, a straight-8 engine

Rail transport
 Paris Métro Line 8, a rapid transit rail line in Paris
 M8 (Istanbul Metro), a rapid transit rail line in Istanbul, Turkey
 M8 (railcar), a Metro-North Railroad car

Military
 M8 Grenade Launcher, see M7 grenade launcher

Aircraft
 Loening M-8, a 1910s American fighter monoplane 
 Miles M.8 Peregrine, a 1930s twin-engined light transport monoplane primarily used by the Royal Aircraft Establishment

Land vehicles
 M8 Armored Gun System, a US Army light tank cancelled in 1996
 M8 Greyhound, an American armored car used during World War II
 M8 Tractor, an artillery tractor used by the US Army
 Howitzer Motor Carriage M8, an American self-propelled howitzer vehicle developed during World War II

Rockets
 M8 (rocket), an American World War II air-to-surface and surface-to-surface rocket
 M-8 rocket, a variant of the RS-82 rocket used by the Soviet Union in World War II

Other uses
 M8, a standard bolt and nut size in the ISO metric screw thread system
 M8 Alliance, World Health Summit
 M8 (magazine), a dance music magazine based in Scotland
 M8, Internet slang for "mate"
 M8, a difficulty grade in mixed climbing

See also

 Yamaha MO8 music synthesizer
 
 8M (disambiguation)
 Mate (disambiguation) ("m8" in texting spelling)
 M (disambiguation)
 8 (disambiguation)
 Model 8 (disambiguation)